is the debut album by Japan-based American heavy metal band Animetal USA, formed as a tribute to Eizo Sakamoto's band Animetal. Released through SME Records on October 12, 2011, the album consists of a series of English language covers of popular anime theme songs. It received an American release on June 26, 2012, containing four bonus tracks from their follow up album Animetal USA W.

The album peaked at No. 18 on Oricon's weekly albums chart, remaining there for nine weeks.

Track listing 
All tracks are arranged by Chris Impellitteri and Marty Friedman.

Personnel 
 Michael Vescera (a.k.a. "Metal Rider") - lead vocals
 Chris Impellitteri (a.k.a. "Speed King") - guitar
 Rudy Sarzo (a.k.a. "Storm Bringer") - bass
 Scott Travis (a.k.a. "Tank") - drums

Charts

Footnotes

References

External links 
 
 
 

2011 debut albums
Animetal USA albums
Covers albums
Sony Music Entertainment Japan albums